Kokkuri-san is a Japanese game popular during the Meiji period that is also a form of divination, based partially on Western table-turning.

Kokkuri-san may also refer to:
Kokkuri-san (film), a 1997 film by Takahisa Zeze
Kokkuri-san: Gekijoban, a 2011 Japanese horror film by Jirō Nagae, starring Mariya Suzuki
Kokkuri-san: Shin Toshi Densetsu, a 2014 Japanese horror film starring Mariya Suzuki

See also
Gugure! Kokkuri-san, a Japanese manga series

ja:狐狗狸